Minuscule 173 (in the Gregory-Aland numbering), ε 209 (Soden), is a Greek minuscule manuscript of the New Testament, on parchment. Palaeographically it has been assigned  to the 12th century. It has marginalia.

Description 

The codex contains the text of the four Gospels on 155 thick parchment leaves (size ), with a large lacunae in the fourth Gospel (John 12:1-21:25). It contains numerous itacistic errors.

The text is written in two columns per page, in 20 lines per page, in brown-black ink.

There is also a division according to the Ammonian Sections, but without references to the Eusebian Canons.

Text 

The Greek text of the codex is representative of the Byzantine text-type. According to Hermann von Soden it belongs to the textual family Kx. Aland did not place it in any Category. 
According to the Claremont Profile Method its text is mixed in Luke 1 and Luke 10. In Luke 20 it represents family Λ. It has some relationship to the textual group 1216.

History 

This codex, together with 174, 175, 176, and 177, was brought from the Library of the Basilian monks.

It was examined by Bianchini, Birch (about 1782), and Scholz. C. R. Gregory saw it in 1886.

It is currently housed at the Vatican Library (Vat. gr. 1983), at Rome.

See also 
 List of New Testament minuscules
 Biblical manuscript
 Textual criticism

References

Further reading 

 

Greek New Testament minuscules
12th-century biblical manuscripts
Manuscripts of the Vatican Library